The 2015 Charleston Southern Buccaneers football team represented Charleston Southern University as a member of the Big South Conference during the 2015 NCAA Division I FCS football season. Led by third-year head coach Jamey Chadwell, the Buccaneers compiled an overall record of 10–3 with a mark of 6–0 in conference play, winning the Big South title. Charleston Southern earned the conference's automatic bid to the NCAA Division I Football Championship playoffs. After a first-round bye, the Buccaneers defeated The Citadel in the second round before losing to the eventual national runner-up, Jacksonville State, in the quarterfinals. Charleston Southern played home games at Buccaneer Field in Charleston, South Carolina.

Schedule

Game summaries

North Greenville

At Troy

East Tennessee State

At The Citadel

Monmouth

At Presbyterian

At Gardner–Webb

Coastal Carolina

At Kennesaw State

Liberty

At Alabama

FCS Playoffs

Second round – The Citadel

Quarterfinals – Jacksonville State

Ranking movements

References

Charleston Southern
Charleston Southern Buccaneers football seasons
Big South Conference football champion seasons
Charleston Southern
Charleston Southern Buccaneers football